Héctor Vilches (14 February 1926 – 23 September 1998) was a Uruguayan footballer, born in Montevideo, who played for C.A. Cerro.

For the Uruguay national football team, he was part of the 1950 FIFA World Cup winning team, but did not play in any matches in the tournament. In total he earned 10 caps for Uruguay.

In his early days he played as a winger for his club, but he then became a right back with the national team, but could play in both positions.  
He played his whole career with his local club C.A. Cerro.

He retired in 1963.

References

External links
World Cup Champions Squads 1930 - 2002
A primeira grande zebra do Mundial (in Spanish)
Uruguay - Record International Players

1926 births
Uruguayan footballers
Uruguay international footballers
1950 FIFA World Cup players
FIFA World Cup-winning players
C.A. Cerro players
1998 deaths
Association football defenders